Los Rey (It All Stays in the Family) is a Mexican telenovela produced by Elisa Salinas for Azteca. It stars Leonardo Garcia, with Michel Brown and Rossana Najera as the protagonists, both dubbed as "La pareja" in the face card, alongside Juan Alfonso Baptista, Ana Belena, Fernando Alonso, Cecilia Ponce, Jose Alonso, Ofelia Medina, Fernando Lujan, Ariel Lopez Padilla, Victor Huggo Martin and Elizabeth Cervantes. Rafael Gutiérrez and Rodrigo Cachero serve as the directors. Los Rey is written by Luis Felipe Ybarra who is also the associate producer. From 3 September 2012 to 22 February 2013, Azteca 13 broadcast Los Rey, replacing La Mujer de Judas.

Episodes

References

Lists of Mexican television series episodes